The 2021 Darwin Triple Crown (known for sponsorship reasons as the 2021 Merlin Darwin Triple Crown) was a motor racing event held on the weekend of 18-20 June 2021 at Hidden Valley Raceway in Darwin, Northern Territory. It was the fifth round of the 2021 Supercars Championship with three 110 kilometre races conducted.

Results

Race 1

Race 2

Race 3

Round Points

References

Darwin Triple Crown
Darwin Triple Crown
Sport in Darwin, Northern Territory
2020s in the Northern Territory
Motorsport in the Northern Territory